is the 15th single by Japanese singer/songwriter Chisato Moritaka. Written by Moritaka and Hideo Saitō, the single was released by Warner Music Japan on February 25, 1992.

Chart performance 
"Concert no Yoru" peaked at No. 7 on Oricon's singles chart and sold 104,000 copies.

Other versions 
Moritaka re-recorded the song and uploaded the video on her YouTube channel on September 22, 2012. This version is also included in Moritaka's 2013 self-covers DVD album Love Vol. 2.

Track listing 
All lyrics are written by Chisato Moritaka; all music is composed and arranged by Hideo Saitō.

Personnel 
 Chisato Moritaka – vocals
 Hideo Saitō – all instruments, programming, backing vocals
 Seiji Matsuura – backing vocals

Chart positions

References

External links 
 
 
 

1992 singles
1992 songs
Japanese-language songs
Chisato Moritaka songs
Songs with lyrics by Chisato Moritaka
Songs with music by Hideo Saitō (musician, born 1958)
Warner Music Japan singles